Stranska Vas ob Višnjici is a small settlement on Višnjica Creek just west of Ivančna Gorica in central Slovenia. The A2 Slovenian motorway crosses the settlement's territory just south of the village core. The area is part of the historical region of Lower Carniola. The municipality is now included in the Central Slovenia Statistical Region.

Name
The name of the settlement was changed from Stranska vas to Stranska vas ob Višnjici in 1953. In the past the German name was Seitendorf.

References

External links
Stranska Vas ob Višnjici on Geopedia

Populated places in the Municipality of Ivančna Gorica